A+ may refer to:

 A+ (blood type)
 A+ (grade), the highest grade achievable in a grading system based on letters of the alphabet
 A+ (magazine), an Apple II periodical published by Ziff Davis, from 1983 to 1989
 A+ (programming language), a dialect of APL with aggressive extensions
 A+ (rapper) (born 1982), Andre Levins, an American rapper
 A+ (EP), 2015 EP by Hyuna
 A-Plus (rapper) (born 1974), Adam Carter, an American rapper
 A+ certification, the professional computer technician certification by CompTIA
 a+ (Mexican TV network), a Mexican TV channel
 Animax (Eastern European TV channel), an anime television channel formerly known as A+
 A-Plus (store), an American convenience store chain owned & operated by Sunoco
 A-Plus TV, a television station in Pakistan
 A Plus (website), a social news company based in New York City
 Missouri A+ schools program, a student incentives program in Missouri
 "A+", the highest average grade that can be given to a film by audiences polled by CinemaScore
 "A-Plus", a song by Hieroglyphics on the album 3rd Eye Vision